Dennis Randall (July 7, 1945 – August 16, 2018) was an American football defensive end and defensive tackle. He played for the New York Jets in 1967 and for the Cincinnati Bengals in 1968.

He died on August 16, 2018, in Oklahoma City, Oklahoma at age 73.

References

1945 births
2018 deaths
American football defensive ends
American football defensive tackles
Oklahoma State Cowboys football players
Players of American football from Oklahoma
Sportspeople from Tulsa, Oklahoma
New York Jets players
Cincinnati Bengals players